Golnar Adili (born 1976 in Virginia) is an Iranian-born American multidisciplinary artist based in Brooklyn, New York. Much of her work is influenced by growing up in post-Iranian Revolution in Tehran and issues of displacement.

Biography 
Adili was born in 1976 in Falls Church, Virginia, but by 1980 at the age four her family moved back to Iran. Her parents were political activists and after their move to Iran, her father was forced to flee back to the United States. She returned to the United States in 1994 to reunite with her father and pursue her college education. In 1998 she received a Bachelor of Fine Arts degree in Painting from the University of Virginia and in 2006 she received a Master's degree in Architecture from University of Michigan.

In 2009 she won a Fellowship in Printmaking/Drawing/Artists Books from New York Foundation for the Arts. Adili has been awarded residencies at Women's Studio Workshop (2015), The MacDowell Colony (2007, 2013), the Rockefeller Foundation at the Bellagio Center, and the Lower East Side Printshop (2014), among others.

Exhibitions 
A list of select exhibitions by Golnar Adili, in order by year.
 2016 – "Language Landscape," Kentler International Drawing Space, Brooklyn, New York
 2014 – "Good News From Iran", Pasinger Fabrik-Munich, Munich, Germany
 2013 – "Art on Paper + 1", The Brussels Contemporary Drawing Fair, Galeri Coullaud and Koulinsky, Paris, France
 2013 – "Displacement", Craft and Folk Art Museum, Los Angeles, California
 2011 – "Forged Patterning: Solo Show", Aun Gallery, Tehran, Iran

See also 
 List of Iranian artists
 List of Iranian women artists
 Iranian modern and contemporary art

References

External links
 Golnar Adili's official website

1976 births
American people of Iranian descent
Artists from Brooklyn
University of Virginia alumni
Taubman College of Architecture and Urban Planning alumni
MacDowell Colony fellows
American contemporary artists
Living people
People from Falls Church, Virginia
Artists from Virginia
21st-century American artists
21st-century American women artists
American artists of Iranian descent